Ray tracing is a technique that can generate near photo-realistic computer images. A wide range of free software and commercial software is available for producing these images. This article lists notable ray-tracing software.

References

3D graphics software
Ray tracing
Ray tracing (graphics)